A purge is the forcible removal of undesirable people from political activity, etc.

Purge or The Purge may also refer to:

 Purge (occupied Japan), the forcible removal of undesirable Japanese from public service during occupation of Japan
 Great Purge, a campaign of political repression in the Soviet Union which occurred from 1936 to 1940
 Induced vomiting, particularly in the context of eating disorders.
 Genetic purging, the enhancement of selection against deleterious alleles that is prompted by inbreeding
 Purging (gas), a fire and explosion prevention procedure to avoid the formation of an ignitable atmosphere
 Purging (manufacturing), a cleaning process of injection molding to clean thermoplastics molding machines and extruders

Films and television
 The Purge, a media franchise developed from the film series created by James DeMonaco
 The Purge (2013 film), an American action-horror film
 The Purge: Anarchy, a 2014 American action-horror film
 The Purge: Election Year, a 2016 American action-horror film
 The First Purge, a 2018 American action-horror film
 The Purge (TV series), a 2018 TV series set in the media franchise
 The Forever Purge, a 2021 American action-horror film
 Purge (2012 film), a Finnish film based on Oksanen's novel

Print
 Purge (comic book), a 2005 Star Wars-based comic book
 Purge (novel), a 2008 novel by Sofi Oksanen

Music
 Purge (album), a 2001 album by Bif Naked
 Purge (Godflesh album), a 2023 album by Godflesh
 Purge (EP), a 1994 EP by Econoline Crush
 "Purge" (song), a 2022 song by Willow
 "The Purge", a song by Schoolboy Q from the 2014 album Oxymoron

Other uses
 Purge (video game), a 2003 first-person shooter
 Purge or PurgeGamers, the aliases of professional eSports player and entertainer Kevin Godec
 PURGE command of Files-11
 In patent law, in cases of patent misuse, discontinuance and elimination of anticompetitive effects of tie-in or other restrictive practices

See also
 Bleeding (disambiguation)
 Detoxification (alternative medicine)
 Colon cleansing, historical/alternative use of detoxification/purging in medicine
 Emetic
 Laxative
 Purging disorder
 Binging and purging